The  Edmonton Eskimos season was the 60th season for the team in the Canadian Football League and their 69th overall. The Eskimos qualified for the playoffs for the fourth straight year, but lost the West Final to the Calgary Stampeders. This is the second season under head coach Jason Maas and the first season under new general manager, Brock Sunderland. The team's former general manager, Ed Hervey, was fired on April 7, 2017.

Offseason

CFL draft
The 2017 CFL Draft took place on May 7, 2017.

Preseason

Regular season

Season standings

Season schedule

Total attendance: 291,916 
Average attendance: 32,435 (57.6%)

Post-season

Schedule

Team

Roster

Coaching staff

References

2017 in Alberta
2017 Canadian Football League season by team
Edmonton Elks seasons